NTA may refer to:
 Nanoparticle Tracking Analysis, a method for visualizing and analyzing particles 
 National Tax Agency, the official tax collecting agency of Japan
 National Tax Association, a non-profit organization in United States
 National Telefilm Associates, was an independent film distribution company
 National Television Awards, a British awards ceremony
 National Testing Agency, government agency which conducts entrance examinations for higher educational institutions in India
 National Transport Authority (Ireland), the public transport licensing agency for Ireland
 National Treasury Administration, the agency of the Ministry of Finance in Taiwan
 National Treatment Agency for Substance Misuse, was a special health authority in England
 Native Title Act 1993, Australian federal legislation
 Natural Science and Technical Academy Isny, a private German university
 Neighborhood Tabulation Area, a geographical unit used for projecting demographics of New York City
 Nepal Telecommunications Authority
 New Transatlantic Agenda, establishment of relations between the US and EU, agreed to in 1995.
 Newark Teachers Association, a trade union in California, United States
 Newton Abbot railway station, Devon, England
 Nigerian Television Authority, a government-owned broadcasting television network in Nigeria
 Nitrilotriacetic acid, an aminopolycarboxylic acid
 Northern Territory Administration, an Australian Government department prior to self-government
 NTA Film Network, a former American television network
 Nuclei Territoriali Antimperialisti, an Italian terrorist group